Nicholas Merrill is an American system administrator, computer programmer, and entrepreneur. He is the founder of Calyx Internet Access, an Internet and hosted service provider founded in 1995, and of the non-profit Calyx Institute. He was the first person to file a constitutional challenge against the National Security Letters statute in the USA PATRIOT Act and consequently the first person to have a National Security Letter gag order completely lifted.

Education and early career

Challenging the National Security Letter: Doe v. Ashcroft 
After receiving a National Security Letter (NSL) from the FBI, he sued the FBI and Department of Justice and became the plaintiff in the lawsuit Doe v. Ashcroft (filed April 9, 2004 in the United States) filed on behalf of a formerly unknown ISP owner by the American Civil Liberties Union and the New York Civil Liberties Union against the U.S. federal government.

The letter—on FBI letterhead—requested that Merrill provide 16 categories of "electronic communication transactional records," including e-mail address, account number and billing information. Most of the other categories remain redacted by the FBI.

Merrill never complied with the FBI's National Security Letter request, and eventually—several years into the lawsuit—the FBI decided it no longer wanted the information it had demanded and dropped its demand for records. However, for several years after dropping the demand, the FBI continued to prevent Merrill from publicly speaking about the NSL, or even from being publicly identified as the recipient of the NSL.

Because National Security Letters are accompanied by an open-ended, lifelong gag order, Merrill was unable to be identified in court papers as the plaintiff in the case and instead was referred to as "John Doe". As the years passed and the person who held the office of Attorney General changed, the case was renamed from Doe v. Ashcroft to Doe v. Gonzales, and then to Doe v. Mukasey, and finally Doe v. Holder. In fact, in 2007 the Washington Post made an exception to its policy against anonymous op-eds to publish an editorial by Merrill because of the gag order.

The case yielded two significant rulings. The first was a September 2004 district court decision that the national security letter statute was unconstitutional, which prompted Congress to amend the law to allow a recipient to challenge the demand for records and the gag order. The second was a December 2008 appeals court decision that held that parts of the amended gag provisions violated the First Amendment and that, to avoid this, the FBI must prove to a court that disclosure would harm national security in cases where the recipient resists the gag order.

On August 10, 2010, after more than 6 years, Nicholas Merrill was partially released from his gag order and allowed to reveal his identity, although he still could not reveal what information the FBI sought from him. This was 3 years after Merrill won The Roger Baldwin 'Medal of Liberty' award from the ACLU, which had to present the award to an empty chair at the time.

Merrill subsequently founded the nonprofit Calyx Institute to provide education and research on privacy issues. The advisory board of The Calyx Institute includes many notable people in the fields of telecommunications, cryptography, privacy advocacy and computer security, including but not limited to John Perry Barlow, Laura Poitras, Susan Herman, Bob Barr and Jason Snyder. The Calyx Institute is a member of the torservers.net network, an organization of nonprofits which specializes in the general establishment of Tor anonymity network exit nodes via workshops and donations. One of the institute's projects is CalyxOS, which is a custom Android distribution using the principles of "privacy by design."

He gave the talk "The importance of resisting Excessive Government Surveillance" at the annual Chaos Communication Congress 2010 from the German Hacker Group Chaos Computer Club in which he told his story of the past 6 years.

On September 14, 2015, 11 years after the initial NSL, a federal district court judge in New York fully lifted the gag order, allowing Merrill to speak freely about the contents of the NSL he received. On November 30, 2015, the unredacted ruling was published in full.

Awards and appointments
 Roger Baldwin 'Medal of Liberty', 2007
Bill of Rights Defense Committee 'Patriot Award', 2012
PopTech 2012 Social Innovation Fellow

See also
National Security Letter
USA PATRIOT Act
Doe v. Ashcroft

References

External links
Calyx Institute (official website)
http://www.aclu.org/FilesPDFs/nsl_decision.pdf
http://www.democracynow.org/2010/8/11/gagged_for_6_years_nick_merrill
http://www.law.duke.edu/publiclaw/civil/index.php?action=showcase&id=29
https://litigation-essentials.lexisnexis.com/webcd/app?action=DocumentDisplay&crawlid=1&crawlid=1&doctype=cite&docid=6+PGH.+J.+Tech.+L.+%26+Pol'y+8&srctype=smi&srcid=3B15&key=32099640c7b53d75580c31af59e61709
http://www.scribd.com/doc/19030726/Doe-vs-Mukasey-Decision

Living people
1972 births
Free speech activists
Privacy activists
American activists
Internet activists
American computer programmers
American businesspeople